Tricholoma argyraceum is a grey-capped mushroom of the large genus Tricholoma. It has been often confused with the similar-looking Tricholoma scalpturatum.

Taxonomy
French mycologist Pierre Bulliard described this species as Agaricus argyraceus in 1779, before his countryman Claude Casimir Gillet gave it its current name in 1874. The generic name derives from the Greek trichos/τριχος 'hair' and loma/λωμα 'hem', 'fringe' or 'border'. It lies within the section Terrea within the subgenus Tricholoma within the genus Tricholoma.

Description
The cap is conical initially and flattening to a convex shape, with a prominent boss. Measuring  in diameter, it is covered with greyish scales, paler than other grey-capped tricholomas, and the crowded gills are white or pale grey and emarginate or adnate in cross section. They sometimes stain yellowish when bruised. The thin flesh is cream or white and has a farinaceous (floury) and somewhat rancid taste and smell.

The poisonous T. pardinum is similar in appearance but with coarser scales on its cap. T.scalpturatum has a darker cap without a boss.

Distribution and habitat
Tricholoma argyraceum occurs across Europe but is uncommon overall. The fruit bodies appear from June to December (occasionally earlier in Spring). The species has an ectomycorrhizal association with a number of genera – birch (Betula), Carpinus, oak (Quercus) and Tilia.

Synonyms 
Obsolete synonyms for Tricholoma argyraceum include:
Agaricus argyraceus Bull. 1779
Agaricus myomyces var. argyraceus (Bull.) Pers. 1801
Tricholoma argyraceum f. inocybeoides (A. Pearson) Mort. Chr. & Noordel. 1999
Tricholoma argyraceum var. inocybeoides (A. Pearson) Krieglst. 1991
Tricholoma inocybeoides A. Pearson 1938
Tricholoma myomyces var. argyraceum (Bull.) J.E. Lange 1933
Tricholoma scalpturatum var. argyraceum (Bull.) Kühner & Romagn. 1953
Tricholoma terreum var. argyraceum (Bull.) P. Kumm. 1871

Edibility
Tricholoma argyraceum is technically edible but of poor quality and inferior to other grey-capped Tricholomas. It has also been classified as inedible.

See also
List of Tricholoma species

References

argyraceum
Edible fungi
Fungi of Europe
Fungi described in 1779
Taxa named by Jean Baptiste François Pierre Bulliard